Thomas Seery (born February 19, 1945) is a lawyer and former member of the Wisconsin State Assembly.

Background
Seery was born on February 19, 1945, in Milwaukee, Wisconsin. He graduated  from Archbishop Quigley Preparatory Seminary, and in 1971 earned a Bachelor of Divinity degree from St. Francis Seminary. He worked as field director for the Citizens Utility Board of Wisconsin and as a Senior Citizen Advocate for the Family Service Association.

Career
Seery was first elected to the Assembly in 1982 from the 7th Assembly district, which included the northwest corner of Milwaukee, which is also the northwest corner of Milwaukee County. He won a plurality in a four-way Democrat primary (the incumbent, fellow Democrat Michael G. Kirby, was [unsuccessfully] seeking nomination to the State Senate), and won the general election with 9,518 votes to 3,860 for Republican William R. Kerner.

References

Politicians from Milwaukee
Democratic Party members of the Wisconsin State Assembly
St. Francis Seminary (Wisconsin) alumni
20th-century American politicians
1945 births
Living people